Side Effects is a 2005 romantic comedy about the pharmaceutical industry, directed by Kathleen Slattery-Moschkau and starring Katherine Heigl as Karly Hert, a pharmaceutical "detailer", who becomes disillusioned with the lack of ethics in the pharmaceutical industry and has tough choices to make.  The film also stars Lucian McAfee, Dorian DeMichele as Karly’s unscrupulous boss, Dave Durbin, Temeceka Harris. The film's title is a reference to the medical term side effects and is based on a true story.

Filmmaker
The film was written and directed by former pharmaceutical sales representative Kathleen Slattery-Moschkau. The movie is a semi-autobiographical account of Slattery-Moschkau's decade of work in the pharmaceutical industry. Katherine Heigl served as the film's executive producer.

Cast
Katherine Heigl as Karly Hert
Dorian DeMichele as Jacqueline
Janet Cresson as Debbie
Nathan Conner as Scott
Beth Herbert as Sarah
Tom Curtis as Dr. Allen
Sandy Adell as Dr. Jones
Debbie Kunz as Carol
Collin Spencer as T. Bates
David M. Ames as Dr. Jakobs
Stacy Brickson as Dr. Collins
John Apple as Plant Manager
Glenn Fahlstorm as Peter Anderson
Robert Irvine as Dr. Wheeler
Jeff Jaeckle as Dr. Rosen
Torrey Jaeckle as Business Man
Jan M. Janssen as Dr. Gardner
Ilka Hoffins as Sally Dobson
Tom Lodewyck as Dr. Smith
Marcia Meise as Shirley
Scott Miles as Dr. Murphy
Dawn Miller-Johnson as Dr. Simmons
Doug Phillips as Pharmacist
Kathleen M. Ross as Liz
Joan Rubens as Betty
Mimi Sagadin as Katie

Production
The film was shot in 18 days in the summer of 2004 on a budget of $190,000.

DVD release
In 2009, New Line and Warner Bros. released the film to DVD.

Reception
The film was praised after its premiere at Cinequest Film Festival and subsequent screenings and featured on the cover of USA Today and in the Health section as well as other positive and critical reviews before it was picked up by Warner Brothers. Later, the film received mixed to negative reviews, it received an approval rating of 11% on Rotten Tomatoes based on 9 reviews.

References

External links

2005 films
2005 romantic comedy-drama films
American romantic comedy-drama films
Pharmaceuticals policy
2005 comedy films
2005 drama films
2000s English-language films
2000s American films